Im Tae-Kyung (Hangul: 임태경; born July 4, 1973), sometimes credited as Lim Tae-kyung, Im Tae-kyeong, or Lim Tae-kyeong, is a South Korean musical actor, television actor, and crossover tenor.

Life and career 
Im's mother is an amateur gugak singer, he grew up listening to various genres of music. Im studied music at Yewon School in Seoul and at Institute Le Rosey in Switzerland. He graduated from Worcester Polytechnic Institute in 1997, with a major in manufacturing engineering and a minor in music. After graduating, Im decided, instead, to pursue a career in music. He trained under renowned Metropolitan Opera tenor Richard Cassilly for a year until Cassilly's sudden death. Discouraged, Im returned to school to pursue a PhD in engineering. However, after careful consideration, Im decided to return to music. During his undergraduate studies, he battled with leukemia.

Im met actress Park So-yeon while they starred in the musical Roméo et Juliette. They began dating shortly thereafter and married in October 2009. The marriage lasted eight months, with the couple divorcing in mid-2010.

Discography
Studio albums
April 8, 2008, Sings The Classics? 
November 24, 2004, Sentimental Journey
 
EP
 18 December 2015, 순수의 시대 (Sunsu-ui sidae)
 5 March 2014, All This Time
13 August 2012, 2012 Masterpiece Vol.1

Single
 20 August 2015, 그대의 계절 (Geudae-ui gyejeol)

OST 
March 14, 2010, The King of Legend OST, My Way; KBS1
October 30, 2007, Lobbyists OST, Fate, SBS
2006, Jumong OST, First Time, MBC 
2005, Lawyers OST, Destiny (옷깃) and Red Road, MBC

Filmography

Television series

Musicals 
Rudolf (as Rudolf), November 10, 2012 – January 27, 2013
Mozart! (as Mozart)
2012 10 July – 4 August M
 May–July 2011 
January–February 2010 
Sopyonje, August to November 2010
Roméo et Juliette (as Romeo)
 November–December 2009 
 July–August 2009 
Hamlet- World version (as Hamlet), August to October 2008
Sweeney Todd (as Sweeney Todd), September–October 2007
Jesus Christ Superstar (as Jesus Christ) 
January–February 2007 
December 2006
Winter Sonata 겨울연가 (as Kang Jun-sang)
 2006 (Sapporo, Osaka, Tokyo)
Sword of Fire 불의 검 (as Asa), September–October 2005

References 

South Korean male singers
1973 births
Tenors
Living people
South Korean male musical theatre actors
South Korean tenors
Alumni of Institut Le Rosey